Mituo Temple is a former Buddhist temple located in Xihu District of Hangzhou, Zhejiang.

History
Mituo Temple was first built in 1878, in the ruling of Guangxu Emperor (1875–1908) of the Qing dynasty (1644–1911). After the founding of the Communist State in 1949, it was used as school, factory and residential building. In 2005 it has been listed among the second group of "Historical Buildings in Hangzhou" by Hangzhou government. It was officially opened to the public in July 2016 after a modern renovation. It is no longer used as a religious building.

Architecture
Along the central axis of the temple stand three buildings including the Shanmen, Giant Buddha Hall and Stone Sutra Pavilion. Subsidiary structures were built on both sides of the central axis including wing-room, dining room and bedroom. The Amitabha Sutra was carved on the wall of the Stone Sutra Pavilion. It is the largest existing cliff stone carving in Hangzhou.

Gallery

References

Buddhist temples in Hangzhou
Buildings and structures in Hangzhou
Tourist attractions in Hangzhou
19th-century establishments in China
19th-century Buddhist temples
Religious buildings and structures completed in 1878